Daphne longilobata is a shrub, of the family Thymelaeaceae.  It is native to China, specifically southwestern Sichuan, eastern Xizang, and northwestern Yunnan.

Description
The shrub is evergreen, and grows to 1.5 meters tall. Its slender branches are pale green. It is often found in forests, shrubby slopes, and among rocks at around 1600–3500 meters in altitude.

Subspecies
Two subspecies are recognized:
Daphne longilobata subsp. lobata
Daphne longilobata subsp. purpurascens (S.C.Huang) Halda, syn. Daphne purpurascens

The Flora of China accepts D. purpurascens as a separate species, distinguishing it by a shorter purplish-red calyx rather than a longer pale green, cream or white calyx.

References

longilobata